Javien Elliott (born July 18, 1993) is an American football cornerback for the Calgary Stampeders of the Canadian Football League (CFL). He played college football at Florida State.

College career
After receiving little attention from college football recruiters in high school, Elliott enrolled at Florida State University after a year at Tallahassee Community College and walked-on to the football team. He spent his first two seasons playing on the team's scout team and earned a scholarship going into his senior season. As a senior, Elliott played in 12 games and started the final six of his career.

Professional career

Tampa Bay Buccaneers
Elliott signed with the Tampa Bay Buccaneers as an undrafted free agent on May 26, 2016. He was released on September 3, 2016 and was signed to their practice squad the next day. He was promoted to the active roster on November 22, 2016.

Elliott appeared in 15 games during the 2017 season with the Buccaneers.

On September 1, 2018, Elliott was waived by the Buccaneers and was re-signed to the practice squad. He was promoted to the active roster on September 8, 2018. On October 23, 2018, Elliot was waived by the Buccaneers and was re-signed to the practice squad. He was again promoted to the active roster on October 31, 2018.

Carolina Panthers
On June 5, 2019, Elliott signed with the Carolina Panthers.
In week 6 against his former team, the Tampa Bay Buccaneers, Elliott recorded an interception off Jameis Winston in the 37-26 win.

References

External links
 Florida State Seminoles bio
 Tampa Bay Buccaneers bio 

1993 births
Living people
American football cornerbacks
People from Panama City, Florida
Players of American football from Florida
Florida State Seminoles football players
Tampa Bay Buccaneers players
Carolina Panthers players
Tallahassee Community College alumni